OA-9E was the tenth flight of the Orbital ATK uncrewed resupply spacecraft Cygnus and its ninth flight to the International Space Station (ISS) under the Commercial Resupply Services (CRS contract) with NASA. The mission launched on 21 May 2018 at 08:44:06 UTC. Orbital ATK and NASA jointly developed a new space transportation system to provide commercial cargo resupply services to the International Space Station. Under the Commercial Orbital Transportation Services (COTS) program, then Orbital Sciences designed and built Antares, a medium-class launch vehicle; Cygnus, an advanced maneuvering spacecraft, and a Pressurized Cargo Module which is provided by Orbital's industrial partner Thales Alenia Space.

History 

The COTS demonstration mission was successfully conducted in September 2013, and Orbital commenced operational ISS cargo missions under the Commercial Resupply Service (CRS) program with two missions in 2014. Regrettably, the third operational mission, Orb CRS-3, resulted was not successful due to spectacular Antares failure during launch. The company decided to discontinue the Antares 100 series and accelerate the introduction of a new propulsion. The Antares system will be upgraded with newly built RD-181 first-stage engines to provide greater payload performance and increased reliability.

In the meantime, the company had contracted with United Launch Alliance for an Atlas V launch of CRS OA-4 in late 2015 from Cape Canaveral, Florida, with a second Atlas V Cygnus launch in 2016. The company had planned Cygnus missions for the first (CRS OA-5), second (CRS OA-6) and fourth quarters (CRS OA-7) of 2016. Two of which flew on the new Antares 230 and one on the aforementioned second Atlas V. These three missions enabled Orbital ATK to cover their initial CRS contracted payload obligation. This particular mission, known as CRS OA-9E, is part of an extension program that will enable NASA to cover the ISS resupply needs until the Commercial Resupply Services-2 (CRS-2 contract) enters in effect, and thus the "E" indicates that it actually is an extension above the originally contracted payload transport.

Production and integration of Cygnus spacecraft is performed in Dulles, Virginia. The Cygnus service module is mated with the pressurized cargo module at the launch site, and mission operations are conducted from control centers in Dulles, Virginia and Houston, Texas.

Spacecraft 

This is the ninth of ten flights by Orbital ATK under the Commercial Resupply Services contract with NASA, and it is considered an extension over the originally contracted flights. This is the sixth flight of the Enhanced sized Cygnus PCM. The mission launched on 21 May 2018.

In an Orbital ATK tradition, this Cygnus spacecraft was named the S.S. J.R. Thompson after the former president and chief executive officer at Orbital Sciences Corp. who died in 2017. Thompson served in multiple management positions at Orbital, overseeing development of the Antares rocket and other vehicles in the company's launcher family.

Manifest 

NASA contracted for the CRS OA-9E mission from Orbital ATK and therefore determined the primary payload, date/time of launch, and orbital parameters for the Cygnus space capsule. The unpressurised cargo consists of a Nanoracks deployer and six CubeSats which will be released after Cygnus unberths from the ISS.

The following is a breakdown of cargo bound for the ISS:
 Crew supplies: 
 Science investigations: 
 Spacewalk equipment: 
 Vehicle hardware: 
 Computer resources: 
 Russian hardware: 
 Nanoracks CubeSat Deployer:

ISS Reboost Test
Several days before unberthing operations were underway, a unique task was performed by Cygnus—a test of the spacecraft’s reboost capability. It was the first time a commercial vehicle performed this task, which is typically handled by Russian Progress spacecraft.

At 4:25 p.m. EDT (20:25 GMT) July 10, Cygnus’s main engine was fired for about 50 seconds. Although it was just a brief reboost test, it still raised the altitude of about 295 feet, according to NASA.

See also 
 Uncrewed spaceflights to the International Space Station

References

External links 
 

Cygnus (spacecraft)
Spacecraft launched by Antares rockets
Spacecraft launched in 2018
Spacecraft which reentered in 2018
Supply vehicles for the International Space Station